Richard Francis Capp (born April 9, 1942) is an American former American football tight end and linebacker who played in the National Football League (NFL). He is from Portland, Maine.

Career
Capp played with the Green Bay Packers during the 1967 NFL season, which won Super Bowl II. He had previously been drafted in the seventeenth round of the 1966 AFL Draft by the Boston Patriots. The following season, he played with the Pittsburgh Steelers.

He played football and basketball at Worcester Academy graduating in 1961 and at the collegiate level at Boston College.

See also
List of Green Bay Packers players
List of Pittsburgh Steelers players

References

External links

1942 births
Living people
Sportspeople from Portland, Maine
Green Bay Packers players
Pittsburgh Steelers players
American football tight ends
American football linebackers
Boston College Eagles football players
Players of American football from Maine